Cybalomia cervinalis is a species of moth of the family Crambidae. It is found in India (Punjab).

References

Moths described in 1908
Cybalomiinae